The Nineties is a documentary miniseries which premiered on July 9, 2017, on CNN. Produced by Tom Hanks and Gary Goetzman's studio Playtone, the 7-part series chronicles events and popular culture of the United States during the 1990s. It serves as a follow-up to the predecessors The Sixties, The Seventies, and The Eighties. CNN greenlit the series in May 2016. One of the episodes, "Isn't It Ironic?", was screened at SeriesFest.

CNN subsequently greenlit two more Playtone/Herzog miniseries for 2018: The 2000s, as well a four-part series premiering over Memorial Day weekend, 1968: The Year That Changed America.

Episodes

Production
CNN announced the production of The Nineties on May 18, 2016, serving as a continuation of their previous miniseries The Eighties.

References

External links

Television series set in the 1990s
2010s American documentary television series
2017 American television series debuts
2017 American television series endings
CNN original programming
Documentary television series about computing
Documentary television series about music
Documentary television series about war
Television series about the history of the United States
Television series by Playtone